Streptomyces pilosus is a bacterium species from the genus of Streptomyces which has been isolated from soil in Rome in Italy. Streptomyces pilosus produces piloquinone and the antidote desferrioxamine B.

Further reading

See also 
 List of Streptomyces species

References

External links
Type strain of Streptomyces pilosus at BacDive -  the Bacterial Diversity Metadatabase	

pilosus
Bacteria described in 1958